Hanne Leland (born 9 May 1990 in Byremo) is a Norwegian artist and songwriter in the electropop genre. She is known for her songs "Stay" and "It's Your Eyes I See". She has toured with All Saints, Gavin James and Greyson Chance

Early life
Hanne Leland was born in the small town of Byremo, in Southern Norway (born May 9, 1990). At the age of 9 she started playing the piano, and she wrote her first song at 10. At 14 she started learning guitar, and she started competing in various talent shows in her home community. When she was 16 years old she won a talent competition that gave her enough money to go to a professional music studio and record her first demo. The demo consisted of 3 self composed songs.

Career

2011–2013 Early releases
Hanne Leland was discovered by an American indie label in 2011, and she left Norway to start recording her debut album in April 2012. After recording the full album, she decided to drop the contract. She released her debut single "Free" independently in September 2012, but decided to trash the rest of the album she had recorded, due to her not being happy with the production of the album.

2013: Nashville
After a failed attempt to record her debut album, she decided to try again. This time with a different producer, and a new team. She got in touch with the Nashville based producer Bruce Bouton (Reba McEntire, Shania Twain, Garth Brooks). She recorded the album "Honest" at Music Row in Nashville, along with members from Taylor Swifts and Dolly Partons band. Her album was done in August 2013, and she went back to Norway where she signed a contract with the Norwegian management Siwu Music and the German label Believe Digital.

2013–2014: Honest
Hanne Leland released her debut single "Beautiful You" off of "Honest" in November 2013. She released her second single "Home Is Where The Heart Is" in February 2014, and the full album "Honest" was released April 25, 2014.

2015: From Country to Pop
In 2015 Hanne Leland decided to switch genres and started writing electro-pop music. She released 4 pop singles including a remix of the song "Into U".

2016: Keep On Movin, QUEEN, and UK tour with All Saints 
Leland released the electro-pop single "Keep On Movin" in March 2016, and followed up with her new single "QUEEN" in September. She joined the British-Canadian girlband All Saints on their UK Red Flag Tour

2017: Hungover You and You Don't Own Me 
Leland released her synth pop ballad "Hungover You" February 2, 2017, and a remix of the song by the Norwegian producer and DJ CLMD was released in April the same year. On June 9 she released her power ballad "You Don't Own Me", a song that was praised as an independence anthem by American magazine Galore.
The Cosmic Dawn remix was released August 11, 2017.

2018 "Carry On" 
Early 2018 saw the release of her single "Carry On" written and produced by Hanne, Chin Injeti and Brian West in Los Angeles.
The track was premiered by Clash Magazine, the song was also featured by Buzzfeed.
In 2018 she also released the synth pop ballad «Stay». The song was premiered by the renowned UK music website The Line Of Best Fit. The song was written by Hanne, and produced by UK producer Jim Eliot. and. «Stay» went viral on YouTube after the YouTube Channel Lit Network uploaded the song, the video has surpassed 4 million views. Later in 2018, Hanne released electro pop song «Fortress», a song she wrote with Jim Eliot  She also released «Underdogs» that year, a song she worked on with London producer Hight. The song was premiered by Clash Music. In an interview with CelebMix Hanne revealed that she wrote the song based on her own experiences. In November 2018 Hanne released a cover of Joni Mitchell’s «River».

2019: «Tour with Gavin James in the UK» 
In January 2019, Hanne Leland joined Irish artist Gavin James as his «special guest» on the «Only Ticket Home Tour» through England and Scotland. The tour visited London, Birmingham, Glasgow  og Manchester.

Hanne Leland released several singles and remixes in 2019
Be With You (Demo), The Nights I Can't Sleep, Weak For You, Delicate, Ego Talking. She released her first EP «Acoustic EP» in August 2019.

2020: «Two EP’s» 
In January 2020, Hanne released her EP «The Heartbreak EP»., Later in the year, Hanne released synth pop ballad «It’s Your Eyes I See». She also released singles «Out of My Mind», «Golden», «Drama»  In September 2020 Hanne released a 4-track EP «After Rain», consisting of 4 songs she created at home, during Coronavirus lockdown.

2021: «Hanne Leland released several singles and EP » 
Hanne released singles like "Even If It Breaks My Heart"  and "You Have Taken Enough From Me"  early in 2021, before she followed up with EP "Melancholic Mind"  October same year. Music videos for "Even If It Breaks My Heart"   and "Bully" are to be found on YouTube on Hanne's official VEVO channel

2022: «Album release» 
Singles like "If I Were To Lose You", "Good Days", and "After You"  were released. The EP "Coffeehouse Covers"  were released in July. Later in the summer it was announced that Hanne's new album "The Art of Growing Up"  is expected in September 2022.

Influences
Hanne has said that she is inspired by Tove Lo because she "is real and raw, and not afraid of being herself" as well as Alanis Morissette, who Hanne says she has listened to "since she was a kid." Hanne also says that Carly Rae Jepsen is "a pop genius" and that Lorde "has such a way with words."

Personal life
Leland is a supporter of the LGBT community, which she says is inspired by her upbringing in South Norway where opinions on LGBT people were negative.

Discography

Albums
«Honest» (2014)

Singles
 «Beautiful You» (2013)
 «Home Is Where the Heart Is» (2014)
 «Hunter» (2014)
 «Divided Soul»" (2015) «One Last Chance» (2015) «Into U» (2015)
 «Into U Cosmic Dawn Remix» (2017) «Keep On Movin» (2016) «QUEEN» (2016)
 «Hungover You» (2017)
 «Hungover You CLMD Remix» (2017)
 «You Don`t Own Me» (2017)
 «You Don`t Own Me Cosmic Dawn» (2017)
 «You Don`t Own Me Acoustic Version» (2017)
 «Hungover You Moxors Remix» (2018)
 «Carry On» (2018)
 «QUEEN Cosmic Dawn Remix»'' (2018)
 "Stay" (2018)
 "Stay (Acoustic)" (2018)
 "Fortress" (2018)
 "Underdogs" (2018)
 "River" (2018)
 "Underdogs (EDES Remix)" (2019)
 "Underdogs (Jamie Vee Remix)" (2019)
 "Ego Talking" (2019)
 "Ego Talking (Acoustic)" (2019)
 "Delicate" (2019)
 "Weak For You" (2019)
 "Weak For You (Kadrian Remix)" (2019)
 "Weak For You (Journoiz Remix)" (2019)
 "Weak For You (Vanessa Ellis Remix)" (2019)
 "Acoustic EP" (2019)
 "The Nights I Can't Sleep" (2019)
 "The Sound of Silence" (2019)
 "Blue Christmas" (2019)
 "Be With You (Demo)" (2019)
 "It's Your Eyes I See" (2020)
 "It's Your Eyes I See (3Mill Remix)" (2020)
 "It's Your Eyes I See (Acoustic)" (2020)
 "Out of My Mind" (2020)
 "Physical" (2020)
 "Drama" (2020)
 "Golden" (2020)
 "You're Not Here" (2020)
 "Water" (2020)
 "Scared" (2020)
 "After Rain" (2020)
 "White Christmas" (2020)
 "Forever and More" (2020)
 "Forever and More (Stripped Down)" (2020)
 "You Have Taken Enough from Me" (2021)
 "Even If It Breaks My Heart" (2021)
 "You Have Taken Enough from Me (Journoiz Remix)" (2021)
 "Gimme More" (2021)
 "Ayo" (2021)
 "Even If It Breaks My Heart (Siqu Remix)" (2021)
 "Transcendence (Demo)" (2021)
 "You Don't Know What It's Like" (2021)
 "Bully" (2021)
 "Bully (RUTH Remix)" (2021)
 "If I Never See Your Face Again" (2021)
 "Melancholic Mind" (2021)
 "When You Wish Upon a Star" (2021)
 "This Time of Year" (2021)
 "What Can I Do" (2022)
 "If I Were to Lose You" (2022)
 "If I Were to Lose You (Siqu Remix)" (2022)
 "Good Days" (2022)
 "If I Were to Lose You (Acoustic)" (2022)
 "After You" (2022)
 "Coffeehouse Covers" (2022)
 "Emotions" (2022)
 "The Art of Growing Up" (2022)

References
 http://www.music-news.com/news/Underground/111359/This-weeks-emerging-and-self-releasing-artists

External links

Norwegian pop singers
Norwegian singer-songwriters
Women singer-songwriters
Norwegian women singers
Musicians from Vest-Agder
Living people
1990 births